Thoiry is a commune in the Ain department in eastern France.

The little village was the scene of the September 1926 meeting between Aristide Briand of France and Gustav Stresemann of Germany. During the meeting the two discussed proposals for finally settling the various claims from the First World War, and their common interest in the then-fashionable paneuropean ideas. Ultimately, however, the meeting came to be a missed chance on the road to European integration, as neither statesman could carry domestic opinion with them on these issues.

The highest peak in the Jura Mountains, the Crêt de la Neige, is located in the commune.

Population

See also
 Communes of the Ain department

References

Communes of Ain
Ain communes articles needing translation from French Wikipedia